The 2020 Copa do Nordeste was the 17th edition of the main football tournament featuring teams from the Brazilian Northeast Region. The competition featured 16 clubs, with Bahia, Ceará and Pernambuco having two seeds each, and Rio Grande do Norte, Sergipe, Alagoas, Paraíba, Maranhão and Piauí with one seed each. Four teams were decided by a qualifying tournament (Pré-Copa do Nordeste). The tournament began on 21 January and ended on 4 August.

Due to the coronavirus pandemic in Brazil, CBF suspended the Copa do Nordeste indefinitely on 17 March 2020. On 7 July 2020, CBF announced that the Copa do Nordeste would be resumed behind closed doors on 21 July 2020. The last round of the group stage, quarter-finals, semi-finals, and finals were played in Salvador, Feira de Santana, Riachão do Jacuípe, and Mata de São João. All the chosen venues are in the state of Bahia.

Ceará defeated Bahia 4–1 on aggregate in the finals to win their second title. As champions, Ceará originally qualified for the Round of 16 of the 2021 Copa do Brasil, however CBF changed the Copa do Brasil format and Ceará qualified for the 2021 Copa do Brasil third round.

Fortaleza were the defending champions, but were eliminated in the semi-finals.

Format
In this season, 12 teams (9 state league champions and best placed teams in the 2019 CBF ranking from Bahia, Ceará and Pernambuco) gained direct entries into the group stage while the other four berths were decided by the Pré-Copa do Nordeste.

For the group stage, the 16 teams were drawn into two groups. Each team played once against the eight clubs from the other group. Top four teams qualified for the final stages. Quarter-finals and semi-finals were played on a single-leg basis and finals were played on a home-and-away two-legged basis.

Teams

2020 Pré-Copa do Nordeste
The 2020 Pré-Copa do Nordeste was the qualifying tournament of 2020 Copa do Nordeste. It was played from 1 to 15 May 2019. Best placed team in the 2019 CBF ranking not already qualified from Alagoas, Bahia, Maranhão, Paraíba, Pernambuco, Piauí, Rio Grande do Norte and Sergipe competed to decide four places in the Copa do Nordeste.

Draw
The draw was held on 24 April 2019, 16:00, at the CBF headquarters in Rio de Janeiro. Teams were seeded by their 2019 CBF ranking (shown in parentheses). The eight teams were drawn into four ties, with the Pot A teams hosting the second leg.

Each tie was played on a home-and-away two-legged basis. If tied on aggregate, the away goals rule would not be used, extra time would not be played, and the penalty shoot-out would be used to determine the winner (Regulations Pré-Copa do Nordeste Article 8).

Matches

|}

Náutico, Confiança, CRB and ABC qualified for 2020 Copa do Nordeste.

Qualified teams

Schedule
The schedule of the competition was as follows.

Draw
The draw for the group stage was held on 26 September 2019, 19:30, at Mansion Eventos in Aracaju. The 16 teams were drawn into two groups of eight containing two teams from each of the four pots with the restriction that teams from the same federation (except Náutico) could not be drawn into the same group. Teams were seeded by their 2019 CBF ranking (shown in parentheses).

A second draw to determine the home-and-away teams for matches between same-state clubs was held on 25 October 2019 at CBF headquarters in Rio de Janeiro.

Group stage
For the group stage, the 16 teams were drawn into two groups of eight teams each. Each team played on a single round-robin tournament against the eight clubs from the other group. The top four teams of each group advanced to the quarter-finals of the knockout stages. The teams were ranked according to points (3 points for a win, 1 point for a draw, and 0 points for a loss). If tied on points, the following criteria would be used to determine the ranking: 1. Wins; 2. Goal difference; 3. Goals scored; 4. Fewest red cards; 5. Fewest yellow cards; 6. Draw in the headquarters of the Brazilian Football Confederation (Regulations Article 12).

Group A

Group B

Results

Final stages
Starting from the quarter-finals, the teams played a single-elimination tournament with the following rules:
Quarter-finals and semi-finals were played on a single-leg basis, with the higher-seeded team hosting the leg.
 If tied, the penalty shoot-out would be used to determine the winner (Regulations Article 10).
Finals were played on a home-and-away two-legged basis, with the higher-seeded team hosting the second leg.
 If tied on aggregate, the penalty shoot-out would be used to determine the winner (Regulations Article 16).
Extra time would not be played and away goals rule would not be used in final stages.

Starting from the semi-finals, the teams were seeded according to their performance in the tournament. The teams were ranked according to overall points. If tied on overall points, the following criteria would be used to determine the ranking: 1. Overall wins; 2. Overall goal difference; 3. Draw in the headquarters of the Brazilian Football Confederation (Regulations Article 17).

Bracket

Quarter-finals

|}

Matches

Semi-finals

|}

Matches

Finals

|}

Matches

Top goalscorers

2020 Copa do Nordeste team
The 2020 Copa do Nordeste team was a squad consisting of the eleven most impressive players at the tournament.

||

References

2020 domestic association football cups
Copa do Nordeste
2020 in Brazilian football
Association football events postponed due to the COVID-19 pandemic